John William Grieb (November 19, 1879 – December 10, 1939) was an American gymnast and track and field athlete who competed in the 1904 Summer Olympics. He was born in Philadelphia. In 1904 he won the gold medal in the gymnastics' team event and silver medal in the athletics' triathlon event. He was also sixth in athletics' all-around event, 52nd in gymnastics' all-around event and 90th in gymnastics' triathlon event.

References

External links
John Grieb's profile at databaseOlympics
John Grieb's profile at Sports Reference.com

1879 births
1939 deaths
Gymnasts from Philadelphia
American male artistic gymnasts
Athletes (track and field) at the 1904 Summer Olympics
Gymnasts at the 1904 Summer Olympics
Olympic gold medalists for the United States in track and field
Olympic silver medalists for the United States in gymnastics
Medalists at the 1904 Summer Olympics
American male triathletes
Track and field athletes from Philadelphia
19th-century American people
20th-century American people